, is a Japanese pop singer, songwriter and multi-instrumentalist from Fukui, Japan. She currently sings under the pseudonym Tiger Fake Fur.

Biography

Early life 
Kawamoto grew up hearing her mother playing the piano. Aside from learning piano, she also studied ballet for about two years and joined the boys' and girls' chorus and took flute lessons.  Her life was changed upon seeing a rock festival held in the nearby Prefectural Hall in her high school days.  Kawamoto entered the Jin-ai Women's College music department, piano department and formed a band.  After graduating from college, Kawamoto found a job at a company and became a piano teacher. However, since she only received a salary of 40,000 yen, she got fed up with her job and quit. Still, she continued to teach piano in her parents' house. She earned her livelihood working at a wedding hall, during which time she continued to try forming a band.

Kawamoto participated in "AIDS against FUKUI" held in Fukui as a band. She wrote the song and made all the members in the hall sing on the pretext of being elected to the executive committee. Because of that, she was invited to Sony’s "Showcase" where amateurs perform live in audition style. Since she was pleased with Tokyo, she saved 1 million yen within half a year, and went to Tokyo at the age of 21. She had a feeling that they liked her performance, but her position was still ambiguous for a while. She worked hard at composition while working part-time in a strange city.  Although poor, she lived happily.

Major label days 
Because Kawamoto often went to the head office of Sony Music Entertainment Japan, she got to know the staff of the management office, and she signed a contract with them at the age of 22.

It was decided that Kawamoto would release a CD from the second production department of Sony.
She practised acoustic guitar hard to reproduce the sound of the demo tape of her debut single "Ai no Sainō" which Yasuyuki Okamura produced.
She was given the stage name of "Makoto Kawamoto" and made her debut as a singer.
She lost weight as the result of pressure from appearing on TV programs or radio programs, and from pressure of composing music.

Kawamoto released her 2nd single "DNA", for which she wrote words and music herself, and her 3rd single "1/2" which were tied to popular anime Rurouni Kenshin, and her first album Kawamoto Makoto.
However, she encountered problems when she found it difficult to write songs after that, and she occasionally confined herself in a hotel.
She did not agree with the record label's plan for her activities, due to pressure, she got out of shape and went home temporarily.
Although she thought she might retire as a musician, she was retained by Sony for two more years, and she returned to Tokyo.
However, she came to devote herself to live performances without releasing a new song after she released the single "Blossom" in 2001.
She came to find pleasure in her work and began to think that she might continue it for a while.
However, after talking it over, she decided not to renew the contract with Sony.
In October 2002, she left.
In April 2003, her contract with Antinos Records expired and she became a freelancer.

Independent music 
In 2005, Kawamoto sang the commercial song of Kanebo "ALLIE", which was Maria Anzai's cover song "."
However, it is not released at present.

In 2005, Kawamoto formed "MihoMihoMakoto" with Miho Asahi and Miho Moribayashi, and they performed in the concerts.

On January 25, 2006, Kawamoto announced that she finished music activity with "Makoto Kawamoto" name in her homepage.

On April 24, 2006, Kawamoto announced that she changed her name to "Tiger Fake Fur" with her blog.
When she appeared on the live by request of her acquaintance before, it was difficult for her to use the name of "Makoto Kawamoto." Under such a circumstance, she could not but use the alias.
She introduced herself as "Tiger Carpet" at first, but she said that she felt sorry for a dead tiger, and renamed it to "Tiger Fake Fur."

On July 5, 2006, Kawamoto released a CD as time-limited group of 3 chorus unit "MihoMihoMakoto" after an interval of five years, and she resumed musical activities completely.

On August 9, 2006, Kawamoto released new 1st single "Yagi-ō no Theme" in the "Tiger Fake Fur" name from HMJM(hamajim) Records.

Recently Kawamoto gives a concert in Tokyo and her hometown, Fukui wherever her feet led her, and she enjoys it.

In 2009, Kawamoto sang "Hontou no Hanashi" in documentary film "An'nyon Yumika".

It is announced that Kawamoto will release her 3rd solo album "" which she produces for herself on February 19, 2010.

Topics 
In the 1990s, she often went to various Southeast Asian countries, especially to Philippines, and made her music videos there. According to her, she traveled to Southeast Asia especially Philippines many times during the 1990s, to absorb "fashionable atmospheres". For this reason, her music videos often contain those landscapes and people.

Discography

Singles

Ai no Sainō 
 is Makoto Kawamoto's 1st single released on May 2, 1996. The English title is "sense of love."

DNA 
DNA is Makoto Kawamoto's 2nd single released on September 2, 1996.

1/2 
 is Makoto Kawamoto's 3rd single released on March 21, 1997.

Sakura 
 is Makoto Kawamoto's 4th single released on April 1, 1998.

Pika Pika 
 is Makoto Kawamoto's 5th single released on April 1, 1999.

Binetsu 
 is Makoto Kawamoto's 6th single released on January 21, 2000.

Fragile 
Fragile is Makoto Kawamoto's 7th single released on April 26, 2000.

Gimmeshelter 
Gimmeshelter is Makoto Kawamoto's 8th single released on March 3, 2001.

Blossom 
Blossom is Makoto Kawamoto's 9th single released on September 30, 2001.

Yagi-ō no Theme 
 is Makoto Kawamoto's 10th single released on August 9, 2006, and is also the 1st single under Tiger Fake Fur name. This song was written for the musical "" which Kawamoto wrote herself and she also played a role in.

Fairy Tunes 
 is Makoto Kawamoto's 11th single released on June 22, 2011, under the name of "Makoto Kawamoto feat. Tiger Fake Fur".

Albums

Kawamoto Makoto 
Kawamoto Makoto is Makoto Kawamoto's 1st album released on June 26, 1997. All songs written by Makoto Kawamoto without No. 2.

gobbledygook 
gobbledygook is Makoto Kawamoto's 2nd album released on March 3, 2001. All songs written by Makoto Kawamoto without No. 5, #7.

Ongaku no Sekai e Youkoso 
Ongaku no Sekai e Youkoso is Makoto Kawamoto's 3rd album released on February 19, 2010, by My Best Records. All songs written and produced by Makoto Kawamoto.

The Complete Singles Collection 1996～2001 
The Complete Singles Collection 1996～2001 is Makoto Kawamoto's Greatest hits album released on February 19, 2010, by SMDR GT Music (Sony Music Direct).

Collaborations

MihoMihoMakoto 
 is the time-limited music group which Miho Asahi, Miho Moribayashi and Makoto Kawamoto formed, and is their 1st album's title released on July 5, 2006.

Guest appearance 
 Sparks Go Go
  – B side song of Sparks Go Go's single  released on March 1, 1998. Kawamoto participated in it as a background vocalist.

Jiro Miwa
  – From his album Sour Lemon released on June 2, 2010. Kawamoto participated in it as a background vocalist and also appeared on the music clip.

 Chappie
 Welcoming Morning (March 9, 1999) – as a background vocalist
 Happyending Soulwriter's Council Band (October 10, 1999) – words： pal@pop, music： Makoto Kawamoto, arrangement： pal@pop & Makoto Kawamoto

CM songs 
  – Kanebo "ALLIE" (2005)
  ~song for boys – Fancl "Calolimit" (2010)

Non-recording 
 Namida no Taiyō
  (2005) is a cover song and a song in adverts of the cosmetics "Allie" of Kanebo.

VHS / DVD

Wasuresōdatta 
 is a video album (VHS) released on July 21, 1997, by Sony record.

Sōtai 
 is a concert tour video (VHS) released on December 12, 1997, by Sony record.

ten.cut.plus.clip 1996–2001 
ten.cut.plus.clip 1996–2001 is a video album (DVD) released on March 6, 2002, by Epic Record Japan. DVD contains music clips and special videos.

Tie-ins 
 "Ai no Sainō": Count Down TV (TBS) the ending theme
 "DNA": Hey! Hey! Hey! Music Champ (Fuji Television) the ending theme (October to December 1996).
 "1/2": Rurouni Kenshin (Fuji Television) 2nd opening theme (Anime television series)
 "Binetsu": Koi no Kami-sama (TBS) theme song (TV drama)

References

External links 
 Official page
 

1974 births
Living people
Actors from Fukui Prefecture
Japanese women pop singers
Japanese-language singers
Japanese multi-instrumentalists
Japanese women singer-songwriters
Japanese singer-songwriters
Sony Music Entertainment Japan artists
Musicians from Fukui Prefecture
21st-century Japanese singers
21st-century Japanese women singers